Manhattan Project is an album by Jamaican-born jazz trumpeter Dizzy Reece featuring performances recorded in 1978 and released on the Bee Hive label.  In 2015, Mosaic Records included this recording in The Complete Bee Hive Sessions (Mosaic MD12-261), a 12-CD box set.

Reception

The Allmusic review by Scott Yanow awarded the album 4½ stars stating "Hopefully, this highly enjoyable Bee Hive LP will someday be rediscovered and reissued on CD".

Track listing
All compositions by Dizzy Reece except as indicated
 "Con Man" - 8:55
 "Manhattan Walk" - 7:59
 "Yule On The Hudson" - 9:05
 "Woody 'n' You" (Dizzy Gillespie) - 13:20
 "One For Trane" (Mickey Bass) - 7:57
Recorded at Blue Rock Studio, N.Y.C. on January 17, 1978.

Personnel
Dizzy Reece - trumpet
Clifford Jordan - tenor saxophone
Charles Davis - tenor saxophone
Albert Dailey - piano
Art Davis - bass
Roy Haynes - drums

References

Bee Hive Records albums
Dizzy Reece albums
1978 albums